The Nauvoo City Council was a short-lived municipal body for the City of Nauvoo, Illinois.

Establishment
The Nauvoo City Charter was passed by the Illinois Legislature on December 16, 1840.   The legislature established the Nauvoo City Council, consisting of the Mayor, four Aldermen, and nine Councilors.  By state law, each office held a two-year term.

According to the charter, members of the City Council also sat on the Municipal Court of Nauvoo – for example, the Mayor doubled in the role of Chief Justice.

Members
 Mayor (Chief Justice)
 John C. Bennett February 1, 1841 – May 17, 1842
 Joseph Smith May 19, 1842 – June 27, 1844

 Aldermen (Associate Justices) 

 Daniel H. Wells (3 Feb. 1841 – 3 Feb. 1845)
 William Marks (3 Feb. 1841 – 6 Feb. 1843)
 Newel K. Whitney (3 Feb. 1841 – 6 Feb. 1843)
 Samuel H. Smith (3 Feb. 1841 – 23 May 1842)
 Gustavus Hills (23 Oct. 1841–6 Feb. 1843)
 Orson Spencer (23 Oct. 1841–3 Feb. 1845)
 George W. Harris (30 Oct. 1841–after 8 Feb. 1845)
 Hiram Kimball (30 Oct. 1841–6 Feb. 1843)
 George A. Smith (11 Feb. 1843–10 Aug. 1844)
 William D. Huntington (4 Sept. 1841–ca. 1846)
 Dimick B. Huntington (23 Oct. 1841–9 Apr. 1842), (23 May 1842–ca. 1846)
 William Clayton (9 Sept. 1842–ca. 1846)
 John Fullmer (4 Sept. 1841–9 Sept. 1842)
 Robert B. Thompson (3 Feb. 1841–27 Aug. 1841)
 Samuel Bennett (4 Mar. 1843– 3 Feb. 1845)

Abolition
In January 1845, the legislature repealed the Nauvoo Charter by a vote of 25-14 in the Senate and 75-31 in the House.  Nauvoo was dis-incorporated and its assets placed into a receivership.

See also
Municipal Court of Nauvoo

References

External links

 
Illinois city councils